Padiham Football Club are an English football team based in Padiham, Lancashire.

History
When the club was formed in 1878 it was among the first football clubs in Lancashire and was well supported, attracting an attendance of 9,000 for a match against neighbours Burnley in 1884. At this time Padiham's ground was on the banks of the River Calder, hence the nickname, The Caldersiders.

Padiham was one of the first clubs to support the legalisation of professional football.  However, this backfired as they were unable to compete with clubs in larger towns such as Burnley, and the club folded in 1916.  The club lost their ground during World War I and lay dormant until after the end of the Second World War.

Then in 1949 the club was resurrected with the opening of the Arbories Memorial Sports Ground. A crowd of 1,777 turned up to see their opening fixture of the season in the Lancashire Combination Football League.

They became founder members of the North West Counties Football League in 1982 but left the league in 1990.  They returned in 2000 after spending £500,000 on upgrading the Arbories Memorial Sports Ground and finished in the top four of the second division in 2003 and 2005.

They gained promotion to the Northern Premier League Division One North for season 2013–14 after winning the North West Counties Football League Premier Division in season 2012–13, but returned to the North West Counties League after being relegated two seasons later.

The Caldersiders finished 13th in the league in the 2021/22 season because of the loyal support of Joe Borg and George Lord.

Racial abuse
In October 2018, a game between Congleton Town and Padiham was called off after fans subjected Padiham players to racial abuse, and Padiham players' wallets were emptied in the changing rooms during the game.

Congleton were fined £160 for their supporters' abuse, while Padiham were fined £165 for leaving the field.

Current Staff
Michael Morrison is the current Padiham FC manager being supported by former player Ben Hoskin (Assistant Manager) Cameron Foster (Coach) Jonathan Kyle (Goalkeeping Coach).

Honours
Lancashire Amateur Cup
Finalists 1965–66
North West Counties League Premier Division
Champions 2012–13
North West Counties League Division One
Runners-up 2008–09
North West Counties League Division Three
Runners-up 1983–84
West Lancashire Football League
Division One Winners 1999–2000
Division Two Winners 1971–72, 1976–77
NHS Bird Cup
Winners 2010–11

Records
FA Cup
Third Round 1883–84
FA Vase
Third Round 1981–82

References

Match programme, F.C. United of Manchester v Padiham, 20 August 2005

External links
 Padiham F.C.

Notes
 This is the club's record attendance.  They attracted an attendance of 1777 for their first match after reforming, against Chorley Reserves in August 1949, but have not recorded a higher attendance since then at the Arbories.

Football clubs in England
Association football clubs established in 1878
Sport in Burnley
1878 establishments in England
Football clubs in Lancashire
West Lancashire Football League
Lancashire Combination
North West Counties Football League clubs
Northern Premier League clubs
Padiham